The San Quintín Glacier is the largest outflow glacier of the Northern Patagonian Ice Field in southern Chile. Its terminus is a piedmont lobe just short of the Gulf of Penas on the Pacific Ocean and just north of 47°S.

Recent retreat
Like many glaciers worldwide during the twentieth century, San Quintín appears to be losing mass and retreating rapidly.

These two photographs taken by astronauts only seven years apart show visible change. The first was taken by the crew of STS-068 in October 1994 and the second by the Increment 4 crew of the International Space Station in February 2002.

San Rafael Glacier in the foreground and San Quintín Glacier behind, showing change over the interval circa 1990–2000.  Both giant glaciers have been retreating rapidly in recent years (BBC story).

See also
List of glaciers

References
National Aeronautics and Space Administration

External links
San Quintín Glacier from San Tadeo river

Glaciers of Aysén Region